Harry van Hoof (born 16 March 1943) is a Dutch conductor, composer and music arranger.

Van Hoof has written many successful productions to his name already, he has his own production company and he had his first success as an arranger with "Sofie" by Johnny Lion. 
Van Hoof conducted Dutch entries on 15 occasions for the Eurovision Song Contest: 1972, 1973, 1974, 1975, 1976, 1977, 1978, 1979, 1986, 1988, 1989, 1990, 1992, 1993 and 1994.

Van Hoof is divorced from singer Trea Dobbs.

References
 A fully-fledged English biography: http://www.andtheconductoris.eu/index.htm?http://www.eurovisionartists.nl/conductor/dir020.asp?ID=131
 http://www.discogs.com/artist/Harry+van+Hoof+Orchestra,+The
 http://www.vanhoofprodukties.nl/
 http://www.discogs.com/artist/Harry+van+Hoof

1943 births
Living people
Eurovision Song Contest conductors
Dutch conductors (music)
Male conductors (music)
People from Hilversum
21st-century conductors (music)
21st-century male musicians